Matteo Ghisolfi (born 25 May 2002) is an Italian professional footballer who plays as a midfielder for Giugliano, on loan from Cremonese.

Club career
He made his Serie B debut for Cremonese on 4 October 2020 in a game against Pisa. He started the game and was substituted at half-time.

On 16 August 2021, he was loaned to Grosseto.

On 31 January 2022, Ghisolfi moved to Fiorenzuola on loan until 30 June 2022.

On 21 July 2022, Ghisolfi joined Giugliano on a season-long loan, the club was newly promoted to Serie C.

References

External links
 

2002 births
Living people
Sportspeople from Cremona
Footballers from Lombardy
Italian footballers
Association football midfielders
Serie B players
Serie C players
U.S. Cremonese players
U.S. Grosseto 1912 players
U.S. Fiorenzuola 1922 S.S. players
S.S.C. Giugliano players